Volosovo is a rural locality (a village) in Nikiforovskoye Rural Settlement, Ustyuzhensky District, Vologda Oblast, Russia. The population was 30 as of 2002.

Geography 
Danilovskoye is the nearest rural locality.

References 

Rural localities in Ustyuzhensky District